Eilema basinota is a moth of the subfamily Arctiinae first described by Frederic Moore in 1866. It is found in the Indian state of Sikkim and the north-western Himalayas.

Subspecies
Eilema basinota basinota
Eilema basinota lurida (Butler, 1889) (Himalayas)

References

basinota